Chhatra Parishad, popularly known as "CP", is the student wing of Indian National Congress, a major political party of India. It is the West Bengal wing of National Students Union of India (N.S.U.I.)

CP is one of the major student organizations in West Bengal and has won student union election in many colleges of West Bengal.

About the Chhatra Parishad 

West Bengal Chhatra Parishad  (abbreviated Chhatra Parishad / West Bengal State Chhatra Parishad and / CP) affiliated to the National Students Union of India (N.S.U.I.) is the students wing of Indian National Congress in the state of West Bengal, India. It was formed on 28 August 1954 in Kolkata under the guidance of Atulya Ghosh and Bidhan Chandra Ray.

Chhatra Parishad is one of the main student organization in West Bengal. CP proposes the idea of student activism based on progressive thought, secular vision and democratic action.

Flag 
A flag with a tri-colour (saffron, white and green) horizontally in the left corner, on a white background and "Advancement of Learning", "Corporate Life" and "Patriotism" written one beneath the other in blue; the ratio of length and breadth of the flag being 3:2.

Student leaders 

 Sourav Prosad , president of West Bengal State Chhatra Parishad.

Past presidents

 Subrata Mukherjee
 Priya Ranjan Dasmunsi
 Bibhash Chaudhury
 Kumud Bhattacharya
 Jayanta Bhattacharya
 Ashok Kumar Deb
 Tapas Roy
 Subhankar Sarkar
 Sourav Chakraborty
 Rahul Ray
 Ashutosh Chatterjee 

Present president is Sourav Prosad

References

Further reading
 
 
 
 

National Students' Union of India
Organisations based in West Bengal
Student organizations established in 1954
1954 establishments in West Bengal
Indian National Congress of West Bengal